Rosa Maria, known by her stage name, Rosinha, is a Portuguese Pimba singer, songwriter and accordion player.

Biography
Rosa was born in 1971 in Montijo, Portugal and grew up in the parish of Santo Isidro de Pegões. Her family moved to Montijo when she was 10; it was also at this time when she started playing the accordion. A few years later Rosa started studying at Instituto de Música Vitorino Matono, in Lisbon. She gave her first concerts at 17, as an accordionist. In 2007, producer Páquito Rebelo invited her to record an album. It was at that time that the singer adopted the stage name "Rosinha". Her first concert as Rosinha was in Évora.

Personal life
Rosa has photosensitivity, requiring her to wear sunglasses.

Discography
 Com a Boca no Pipo (2007)
 Só Quer é Fruta (2008)
 Eu Levo no Pacote (2009)
 Eu Chupo (2010)
 Quem põe a minhoca ... (sou eu) (2011)
 Tenho Um Andar Novo (2012)
 Na Minha Panela Não Entra (2013)
 Eu Seguro no Pincel (2014)
 Eu Lavo a Ameijôa (2015)
 Eu Faço De Coentrada (2016)
 É de Gatas Que Eu Gosto (2017)
 Eu Descasco-lhe a Banana (2018)
 Eu Mexo Nos Telhões do Meu Amor (2019)
 Fica Sempre no Coador (2020)
 Eu Tenho Uma Cana Boa (2021)
 Eu Agarro-lhe no Barrote (2022)

References

1971 births
Living people
People from Montijo, Portugal
Pimba music
21st-century Portuguese women singers
Portuguese accordionists